Leprechaun Lines is a private bus company headquartered in New Windsor, New York. The company uses a fleet of coach-style buses to provide charter functions and a variety of services. Two local routes run through Newburgh, connecting major shopping and employment destinations. Additionally, a commuter shuttle route runs between Stewart International Airport, Downtown Newburgh, a park and ride location on New York State Route 17K, and the Beacon Metro-North Station. In Orange County, Leprechaun operates the Newburgh Area Transit system for TransitOrange, using Gillig Low Floor HEV 35' and Gillig Phantom 35' buses. Previously, they used OBI Orion I and Orion V buses.

Stewart Airport, which is a rapidly growing reliever airport for the New York City area, is only served by Leprechaun's system.

On the Dutchess County side of the Hudson River, a commuter express line between Poughkeepsie and the massive suburban office park developments of White Plains is also operated by the agency. From Wednesday through Saturday, a schedule tourist service is also offered, running from Poughkeepsie and Newburgh to Atlantic City, New Jersey.

Routes

See Newburgh Area Transit for information on routes operated on behalf of TransitOrange.

References

External links
Leprechaun Lines

Bus transportation in New York (state)
Surface transportation in Greater New York